Joaquín Jiménez Hidalgo (18 December 1935 – 2 December 2021) was a Spanish politician. A member of the People's Alliance, he served in the Senate of Spain from 1982 to 1986.

References

1935 births
2021 deaths
Spanish politicians
Members of the Senate of Spain
People's Alliance (Spain) politicians
People's Party (Spain) politicians
People from the Province of Córdoba (Spain)